Chelsea Bridge was a Canadian jazz quartet based in Ottawa, Ontario. Its members were Rob Frayne on tenor and soprano saxophone, bassist John Geggie, drummer Jean Martin, trumpet player Clyde Forsberg, and singer Tena Palmer. The band was highly-regarded, with critics calling it 'cutting-edge' and 'ground-breaking'. In a Centretown News online article, a reviewer called the group "one of Ottawa's most prestigious jazz groups."

Career
The group played, for the most part, songs written by Frayne, Geggie, and Palmer. 

They toured extensively, conducting four Canadian tours and playing New York's Blue Note Jazz Club, Moldejazz (the Molde International Jazz Festival) in Norway, the Washington DC Jazz Festival, the Guelph Jazz Festival, the Montreal International Jazz Festival, the Vancouver International Jazz Festival and the Newport Jazz Festival.

In 1997, Chelsea Bridge was the subject of a "Jazzumentary" by Douglas Von Rosen called Chelsea Bridge.

Discography

Blues in a Sharp Sea (Post-bop, 1992), Unity Records
Tatamagouche...Next Left (Avant-Garde Jazz, 1994), Unity Records
Double Feature (Avant-Garde Jazz, 1995), Unity Records
Chelsea Bridge (2002)

References

Canadian jazz ensembles
Musical groups from Ottawa
Musical groups established in 1992
Musical groups disestablished in 1997
1992 establishments in Ontario
1997 disestablishments in Ontario